86th NYFCC Awards
December 18, 2020

Best Picture: 
First Cow

The 86th New York Film Critics Circle Awards, honoring the best in film for 2020, were announced on December 18, 2020.

Winners

Best Film:
First Cow
Best Director:
Chloé Zhao – Nomadland
Best Actor:
Delroy Lindo – Da 5 Bloods
Best Actress:
Sidney Flanigan – Never Rarely Sometimes Always
Best Supporting Actor:
Chadwick Boseman – Da 5 Bloods (posthumous)
Best Supporting Actress:
Maria Bakalova – Borat Subsequent Moviefilm
Best Screenplay:
Eliza Hittman – Never Rarely Sometimes Always
Best Animated Film:
Wolfwalkers
Best Cinematography:
Shabier Kirchner – Small Axe
Best Non-Fiction Film:
Time
Best Foreign Language Film:
Bacurau • Brazil
Best First Film:
Radha Blank – The Forty-Year-Old Version
Special Award:
Spike Lee and Kino Lorber

References

External links
 

2020 in New York City
2020 in American cinema
New York
New York Film Critics Circle Awards
New